Jhol (Sindhi: جھول)  is a small town In Sanghar District, Sindh, Pakistan. This town is located at distance of about 12 kilometers in the south west of Sangher along Hyderabad Sangher Highway. 

This town had a railway station along the Mirpurkhas Nawabshah section but currently no train service is available on this line. The population of the town is 21,792 (2017).

References 

Populated places in Sanghar District